The Protectors is a Danish crime TV series from 2009 that follows the police bodyguard squad P.E.T. (Politiets Efterretningstjeneste), which is in charge of protecting VIPs, including Danish royalty and politicians.

Overview 
The series follows three recruits, Jasmina El-Murad (Cecilie Stenspil), Jonas Goldschmidt (André Babikian), and Rasmus Poulsen (Søren Vejby), who go swiftly from training camp to full-fledged police bodyguards. Jasmina is the only woman, and an Egyptian Muslim, on the team.

Cast 
 Cecilie Stenspil as Jasmina El-Murad, a newly trained bodyguard; she is the only woman in the class of 20 who train to become bodyguards
 Søren Vejby as Rasmus Poulsen, a newly trained bodyguard; he lives in a church building he renovated
 André Babikian as Jonas Goldschmidt, a newly trained bodyguard; he is Jewish and is married with one child. In the second episode he tells his wife he had an affair
 Thomas W. Gabrielsson as Leon Hartvig Jensen, PET's Chief of Security
 Ditte Gråbøl as Diana Pedersen, Secretary at PET
 Rasmus Bjerg as 'Lille Kurt' Birk, the PET Group Leader who is in charge of training the new bodyguards
 Ellen Hillingsø as Benedikte 'Tønne' Tønnesen, PET
 Tommy Kenter as Jørgen Boas, PET psychiatrist
 Michael Sand as Store Kurt, a veteran bodyguard
 Benjamin Boe Rasmussen as Trikker
 Kim Jansson as Fjordby
 Anne Birgitte Lind as Claudia
 Kate Kjølby as Asha El-Murad, Jasmina's sister

Series overview 
A first season aired in 2009. A second and final season was released in 2010, each season had 10 episodes.

Episodes

Season 1 (2009)

Season 2 (2010)

Production 
The Protectors was created and written by Peter Thorsboe and Mai Brostrøm. The show was the third in a trilogy of shows created by Thorsboe: Unit 1 and The Eagle.

Broadcast 
The series screened in Australia in 2011 and 2012 on SBS and is available on DVD and Hulu with English subtitles.

Awards and nominations 
It won an International Emmy Award from the International Academy of Television Arts & Sciences for best non-American television drama series in 2009. The series was filmed on location in Copenhagen (Denmark).

References

External links 
 Livvagterne at DR1
 

2009 Danish television series debuts
2010 Danish television series endings
2000s Danish television series
2010s Danish television series
Danish crime television series
Danish drama television series
International Emmy Award for Best Drama Series winners
Detective television series
Danish-language television shows
DR TV original programming